Moses ǁGaroëb Constituency is an electoral constituency in Windhoek, the capital of Namibia. It had a population of 45,564 in 2011, up from 25,642 in 2001.  it had 41,550 registered voters.

The constituency was created in 2003 under the name Western Hakahana at the recommendation of the Third Delimitation Commission which suggested that the constituency of Hakahana be split. Since then, the suburb of Hakahana falls into two different constituencies. In 2008 the constituency was named after the politician Moses ǁGaroëb. The eastern part of Hakahana is now called Tobias Hainyeko constituency, after politician Tobias Hainyeko.

Politics

In the 2015 regional election SWAPO won by a landslide. Its candidate Martin David was elected with 5,330 votes, while the only opposition candidate, Paulus Shikwamhanda of the Rally for Democracy and Progress (RDP) only received 286 votes. The SWAPO candidate also won the 2020 regional election, albeit by a much smaller margin. Aili Venonya received 5,983 votes. Tommy Efraim of the Independent Patriots for Change (IPC), an opposition party formed in August 2020, came second with 3,960 votes. Following the dearth of Aili Venonya in October 2020, Swapo party candidate Stefanus Ndengu won the Moses //Garoëb constituency by-election after receiving 2 970 votes, in January 2023.

References 

Constituencies of Khomas Region
Windhoek
2003 establishments in Namibia
States and territories established in 2003